Kallósd is a village in Zala County, Hungary. 
The famous church of the settlement, the Saint Anne Church in Kallósd, is being one of the few round churches from the Árpád Age, and it listed among the most significant monuments of Hungary.

References

Populated places in Zala County